Gordon Craig is the name of:
Edward Gordon Craig (1872–1966), sometimes known as Gordon Craig, English modernist theatre practitioner
Gordon A. Craig (1913–2005), Scottish-American historian of German history and of diplomatic history
Gordon M. Craig (1929–1950), soldier in the United States Army and Medal of Honor recipient
Gordon Craig (actor), British actor
Gordon Craig (sports executive), Canadian sports executive

See also 
Craig Gordon (born 1982), Scottish footballer
Gordon Craig Theatre, a theatre in Stevenage, Hertfordshire, England